Leonie Antonia Beck (born 27 May 1997) is a German swimmer. She competed in the women's 800 metre freestyle event at the 2016 Summer Olympics.

At the 2022 European Aquatics Championships, held in Rome, Italy with open water swimming at Ostia in August, Beck won the gold medal in the 10 kilometre open water swim with a time of 2:01:13.4.

References

External links
 

1997 births
Living people
German female swimmers
German female freestyle swimmers
Olympic swimmers of Germany
Swimmers at the 2016 Summer Olympics
Swimmers at the 2020 Summer Olympics
Sportspeople from Augsburg
European Aquatics Championships medalists in swimming
World Aquatics Championships medalists in open water swimming
German female long-distance swimmers